Nuno Miguel Fonseca Ferreira (born 1973) is the current president of ISEC "Coimbra Institute of Engineering". Nuno Ferreira formally took office April 13, 2010, succeeding Jorge Bernardino. Ferreira's official inauguration celebrations took place at the principal auditorium at 16:30. He was received with high expectations being a former alumni of ISEC.

Education
Ferreira received his bachelor's degree in "Engenharia Electrotécnica" English equivalent of Electrical and Computer Engineering from the "Coimbra Institute of Engineering" in 1996. In 1998 his Masters of Engineering in Electrical and Computer Engineering at the "Faculdade de Engenharia do Porto". He concluded is PhD in Electrical and Computer Engineering at "Universidade de Trás-os-Montes e Alto Douro" (UTAD) in 2006.

Career
He is a professor at the Electrical and Computer Engineering department at ISEC since 1997.

Ferreira has served as vice-president from 2003 to 2005, the polytechnic's second highest officer.

External links 
 Nuno Miguel Fonseca Ferreira, President, Instituto Superior de Engenharia Coimbra
 https://web.archive.org/web/20110723042901/http://www.cienciapt.net/pt/index2.php?option=com_content&do_pdf=1&id=100699  (in Portuguese)
 https://web.archive.org/web/20111007191504/http://www.rebides.oces.mctes.pt/rebides09/rebid_m3.asp?CodD=19313&CodP=3064 (in Portuguese)

References 

Living people
1973 births
Portuguese engineers
Academic staff of the Polytechnic Institute of Coimbra